Wear is the erosion of material from a solid surface by the action of another material.

Wear may also refer to:
 Putting on clothing
 River Wear, in North East England
 WEAR-TV, an ABC affiliate in Pensacola, Florida, U.S.
 World Engineering Anthropometry Resource, (WEAR), a non-profit group for sharing anthropometric data
 Wear (journal), a scientific journal
 Wear (surname), includes a list of people with the name
 Wearing ship or jibe, a sailing maneuver

See also
 
 
 Wear and tear, damage that naturally occurs as a result of use or aging
 Wear Valley (disambiguation)
 Weare (disambiguation)
 Ware (disambiguation)
 Where (disambiguation)
 Weir (disambiguation)